Maksym Valeriyovych Solovyov (born 22 February 2002) is a Ukrainian professional footballer who plays as a defensive midfielder for Prykarpattia Ivano-Frankivsk on loan from Dnipro-1.

Career
Born in Kharkiv, Solovyov is a product of the local Metalist Kharkiv and also Dnipro academies and in August 2019 he signed a contract with Ukrainian side Dnipro-1 and played for its in the Ukrainian Premier League Reserves and Under 19 Championship. 

Starting from July 2021, he played on loan first as a main choice midfielder of Nikopol in the Ukrainian Second League, and later in Prykarpattia Ivano-Frankivsk in the Ukrainian First League.

References

External links
 
 

2002 births
Living people
Footballers from Kharkiv
Ukrainian footballers
Ukraine youth international footballers
Association football midfielders
SC Dnipro-1 players
FC Nikopol players
FC Prykarpattia Ivano-Frankivsk (1998) players
Ukrainian First League players
Ukrainian Second League players